Leonas Milčius (born 11 December 1942) is a Lithuanian politician. In 1990 he was among those who signed the Act of the Re-Establishment of the State of Lithuania.

External links
 Biography 

1942 births
Living people
Members of the Seimas
Place of birth missing (living people)
Vytautas Magnus University Agriculture Academy alumni
20th-century Lithuanian politicians